Costantini is an Italian surname. Notable people with the surname include:

Alessandro Costantini (c. 1581–1583 – 1657), Italian Baroque composer
Bartolomeo Costantini (1889–1941), Italian aviator and racing driver
Celso Benigno Luigi Costantini (1876–1958), Italian cardinal
Costantino Costantini, Italian politician and lawyer 
Dino Costantini
Eduardo Costantini (born 1946), Argentine businessman
Emilio Costantini
Ermenegildo Costantini (1731-1791), Italian painter, active in Rome 
Fabrizio Costantini
Flavio Costantini (1926–2013), Italian artist
Francesco Costantini (1827–1899), Italian lawyer and politician
Gianluca Costantini (born 1971), Italian cartoonist, artist, Comic journalist, and activist
Humberto Costantini (1924–1987), Argentine writer and poet
Livia Nannini Costantini
María Teresa Costantini (born 1949), Argentine actress
Nicholas Costantini (born 1989), Italian footballer
Pierre Dominique Costantini (1889–1986), French soldier, journalist, writer and Bonapartist militant
Tommaso Costantini (born 1996), Italian football player

Italian-language surnames
Patronymic surnames
Surnames from given names